Love Letters of a Portuguese Nun is a 1977 West German-Swiss film directed by Jesús Franco and produced by Erwin Dietrich, loosely based on the Letters of a Portuguese Nun attributed to Mariana Alcoforado. It starred Susan Hemingway and William Berger. Franco co-wrote the screenplay with producer Dietrich.

It tells the story of Maria, a girl in Inquisition-era Portugal, whom a priest sees cavorting with a boy.  He orders her to become a nun as penance.  In the convent Maria gets subjected to all sorts of torture and humiliation at the hands of the priest and the mother superior.

The movie is part of a genre known as "nunsploitation".

Cast
 Susan Hemingway: Maria Rosalea
 William Berger: Father Vicente
 Herbert Fux: Satan
 Ana Zanatti: Mother Alma, the grand priestess
 Aida Vargas: Juana, a nun (as Aida Kargas)
 Vítor Mendes: António Fernando Queiroz de Melo, the mayor
 Aida Gouveia: Antónia, a nun (as Isa Schneider)
 Herman José: Manuel Gonçalves, the prince (as Hermann Krippahl)
 José Viana: The Grand Inquisitor (as Jose Viana)
 Patricia Da Silva: Maria's mother
 Victor de Sousa: Inquisitor's aid
 Nicolau Breyner: Prince's aid
 Clara Marabuto: Josefina, a nun
 Esther Studer: nun at the ritual
 Dagmar Bürger: nun at the ritual

References

External links
 

1977 films
1977 horror films
Swiss horror films
German horror films
West German films
Films directed by Jesús Franco
Nunsploitation films
Films about Satanism
Films set in Portugal
Films set in the 17th century
1970s German films